Alexander Mikhailovich Ovechkin (born 17 September 1985) is a Russian professional ice hockey left winger and captain of the Washington Capitals of the National Hockey League (NHL). Nicknamed "Ovi" (alternatively spelled "Ovie") and "the Great Eight" in reference to his jersey number, Ovechkin is widely regarded as one of the greatest goal scorers of all time. Second only to Wayne Gretzky for all-time goal scoring, Ovechkin also holds many records, including the most power play goals, most goals in away games, and most goals with the same team in NHL history. He is the third NHL player, behind Gordie Howe and Gretzky, to score 800 goals in the regular season.

Ovechkin began his professional career with Dynamo Moscow of the Russian Superleague in 2001, playing there for four seasons and returning briefly during the 2012–13 NHL lockout. A highly touted prospect, Ovechkin was selected by the Capitals first overall in the 2004 NHL Entry Draft. In the 2005–06 season, Ovechkin's first with the Capitals, he scored 52 goals and 54 assists to lead all rookies in points, capturing the Calder Memorial Trophy as rookie of the year and finishing third overall in league scoring.

Ovechkin has won the Maurice "Rocket" Richard Trophy, awarded annually to the NHL's leading goal scorer, an NHL-record nine times, first doing so in 2007–08, when his 65 goals and 112 points also earned him the Art Ross Trophy for most points scored. He has scored 50 goals in a season nine times, tying Mike Bossy and Gretzky for the most 50-goal seasons in NHL history. He has won the Hart Memorial Trophy for most valuable player three times (in 2008, 2009, and 2013), and the Lester B. Pearson Award/Ted Lindsay Award for best player as voted on by the National Hockey League Players' Association three times (2008, 2009, 2010). In 2018, Ovechkin won the Stanley Cup for the first time, and was awarded the Conn Smythe Trophy for most valuable player in the 2018 playoffs. He has also been named to the NHL first All-Star team eight times, and the second All-Star team four times. In 2017, Ovechkin was named one of the 100 Greatest NHL Players of all time.

Internationally, Ovechkin has represented Russia in multiple tournaments. His first IIHF tournament was the 2002 World U18 Championship. The following year he made his debut at the World Junior Championship, helping Russia win the gold medal. He played two more years at the World Juniors, as well as once more at the World U18 Championships. Ovechkin's first senior tournament was the 2004 World Championship, and he also played in the World Cup that year. Ovechkin has also played for Russia at the Winter Olympics in 2006, 2010, and 2014. Overall, Ovechkin has represented Russia at thirteen World Championships and three Olympics in his career, winning the World Championship three times.

Early life
Ovechkin was born on 17 September 1985 in Moscow, the son of Soviet athletes. His mother, Tatyana Ovechkina, is a two-time Olympic gold medalist (1976, 1980) and world champion (1975) in basketball. His father, Mikhail, was a football player. He has two older brothers, Sergei and Mikhail. His mother sensed her youngest son was destined for "sporting greatness". "From birth, it was obvious," she said. "In a child, it's clear immediately. He was very active and walking and curious." He was two years old when he first picked up a hockey stick. Whenever a hockey game came on television he would drop whatever he was doing, refusing to allow his parents to change the channel.

In early childhood, he moved with his family to a tall high-rise building surrounded by a "crumbling neighborhood" on the outskirts of Moscow. There he attended public school #596, infamous for military discipline and a "tyrannical" principal, completing eight and a half grades before starting at Dynamo Moscow's sports school. While he saw his friends "getting high and getting dead," Ovechkin was attending daily training sessions morning and night. "You dive into sport with your head and arms and legs, and there's no time for anything else," he said of this early training.

Whenever his parents were no longer able to get young Alex to hockey events, his elder brother Sergei stepped up, making sure his little brother got where he needed to go. When Ovechkin was 10, his brother Sergei died of a blood clot following a car accident. Ovechkin had a youth hockey game the next day, which his parents insisted he play in. Ovechkin credits his elder brother Sergei for introducing him to, and encouraging him to pursue hockey. When he scores, Alex will often kiss his glove and point to the sky in a salute to his brother.

He made a name for himself in the Dynamo Moscow system when at 11 he scored 56 goals, breaking Pavel Bure's record of 53. Meanwhile, Ovechkin dreamed of playing in the NHL, keeping the cards of star players stashed in his room, especially those of his idol, Mario Lemieux. "It's the best hockey there is," Ovechkin would say of the NHL.

Playing career

Dynamo Moscow (2001–2005)
Ovechkin began playing in the Russian Super League (RSL) in Dynamo Moscow at the age of 16. Making his professional debut in the 2001–02 season, he scored four points in 21 games. He would spend three seasons there prior to being drafted by the NHL, and he would rack up 36 goals and 32 assists in 152 career games.

The following off-season, Ovechkin was selected first overall in the 2004 NHL Entry Draft by the Washington Capitals. He had been projected as the first overall pick for nearly two years and had earned comparisons to Mario Lemieux. He was so highly regarded that the Florida Panthers attempted to draft him in the 2003 NHL Entry Draft in the ninth round, even though his birthday was two days after the cut-off (15 September 1985). Rick Dudley, the general manager of the Panthers, claimed the pick was legitimate, claiming that Ovechkin was old enough with leap years taken into consideration.

Due to the 2004–05 NHL lockout, Ovechkin remained with Dynamo for one more season. He recorded 27 points in 37 games in 2004–05, while missing nearly two months of play because of a shoulder injury sustained in the gold medal game against Canada in the 2005 World Junior Championships. In the playoffs, he helped Dynamo win the RSL title.

With the threat of the lockout canceling another NHL season, Ovechkin signed a contract with rival Russian team Avangard Omsk. In order to maintain his eligibility for the NHL in the event that the lockout ended, the contract contained an out clause with a 20 July 2005, deadline. Although a new NHL collective bargaining agreement (CBA) had not yet been reached between players and owners, Ovechkin decided to opt out and signed with the Capitals on 5 August 2005. The deal was a three-year, entry-level contract worth the rookie maximum of $984,200 per season with performance-based bonuses to inflate his annual salary to as much as $3.9 million.

Washington Capitals (2005–present)

2005–2012

Two days after signing, the lockout ended with a new CBA. Ovechkin played his first game with the Capitals on 5 October 2005, scoring two goals against goalie Pascal Leclaire in a 3–2 victory over the Columbus Blue Jackets. On 13 January 2006, in Anaheim, Ovechkin scored his first career hat trick against Jean-Sébastien Giguère of the Mighty Ducks of Anaheim to help Washington win the game. Three days later, on 16 January, he scored a goal that veteran hockey reporter Bill Clement called "one of the greatest goals of all time." Knocked down by Phoenix Coyotes defenseman Paul Mara and sliding on his back facing away from the net, Ovechkin was able to hook the puck with one hand on his stick and slide it into the net past goalie Brian Boucher for his second goal of the night. It became referred to as "The Goal." Auston Matthews, a future Toronto Maple Leafs first overall selection, was in attendance during the game; he said in an interview during the 2016–17 season that it was the best goal he ever saw live. On 1 February, Ovechkin was named NHL Rookie of the Month for January 2006 as well as being named Offensive Player of the Month, becoming only the third player in NHL history to earn both honors simultaneously.

Ovechkin finished the 2005–06 season leading all NHL rookies in goals, points, power play goals and shots. He finished third overall in the NHL in scoring with 106 points and tied for third in goals with 52. His 425 shots led the league, set an NHL rookie record, and was the fourth-highest total in NHL history. Ovechkin's point total was the second-best in Washington Capitals history and his goals total tied for third in franchise history. He was also named to the NHL first All-Star team, the first rookie to receive the honor in 15 years. After the season ended, Ovechkin received the Calder Memorial Trophy, awarded to the NHL's best rookie.

He was also a finalist in his rookie season for the Lester B. Pearson Award. EA Sports made him one of the cover athletes for NHL 07. The following season, Ovechkin appeared in his first NHL All-Star Game in Dallas on 24 January 2007. He completed his second NHL season with 46 goals and 92 points.

Playing in the final season of his rookie contract, in 2007–08, Ovechkin signed a 13-year contract extension worth $124 million with the Capitals on 10 January 2008. The contract, which averages $9.5 million per year, was the richest in NHL history. Working without an agent, Ovechkin negotiated with Capitals owner Ted Leonsis and former general manager George McPhee.

Late in the season, on 3 March 2008, Ovechkin notched his 50th, 51st and 52nd goals of the campaign for his fourth career NHL hat trick and to hit the 50-goal mark for the second time in his career. Later that month, on 21 March, Ovechkin scored his 59th and 60th goals of the season against the Atlanta Thrashers, becoming the first NHL player to score 60 goals in a season since Mario Lemieux and Jaromír Jágr in 1995–96 and 19th player overall. Four days later, on 25 March, Ovechkin scored his 61st goal of the season to break the Washington Capitals' team record for goals in a single season previously held by Dennis Maruk. He also went on to break Luc Robitaille's record for most goals by a left winger in one season on 3 April, by scoring two goals for his 64th and 65th of the season. He also became the first NHL player to score at least 40 even-strength goals in one season since Pavel Bure in 1999–2000.

Leading the league in scoring with 65 goals and 112 points, Ovechkin captured both the Art Ross Trophy and the Maurice "Rocket" Richard Trophy in 2007–08. It was the first time in 41 seasons that a left-winger led the NHL in points since Bobby Hull led the league with 97 points in 1965–66.

Ovechkin helped lead a rejuvenated Capitals team back to the Stanley Cup playoffs with a stronger supporting cast that included countryman Alexander Semin, rookie center Nicklas Bäckström and defenseman Mike Green. He scored the game-winning goal in his NHL playoff debut with less than five minutes left in game 1 against the Philadelphia Flyers. He scored nine points in seven games against the Flyers as the Capitals were eliminated in the opening round.

In the off-season, Ovechkin was awarded the Lester B. Pearson Award as the most outstanding player voted by the National Hockey League Players' Association (NHLPA) and the Hart Memorial Trophy as the league's MVP, becoming the first player in the history of the NHL to win four major regular season awards, including the Art Ross and Rocket Richard trophies. Ovechkin was also awarded his third consecutive Kharlamov Trophy, named after Soviet hockey star Valeri Kharlamov and presented by Sovetsky Sport newspaper, as the best Russian NHL player as voted by other Russian NHL players.

In late October of the 2008–09 season, Ovechkin returned home to Moscow to visit his ailing grandfather, missing only the second game of his career up to that point, snapping a consecutive streak of 203 games played. On 5 February 2009, Ovechkin scored his 200th goal, against the Los Angeles Kings, becoming only the fourth player in the NHL to reach the milestone in four seasons, joining Wayne Gretzky, Mike Bossy and Mario Lemieux. On 19 March, he scored his 50th goal of the season, becoming the first Washington Capitals player to reach the 50-goal mark three times. He finished the campaign with 56 goals to capture his second consecutive Rocket Richard Trophy, joining Jarome Iginla and Pavel Bure as the third player to win the award twice and the second player after Bure (2000 and 2001) to win the award in back-to-back seasons. With 110 points, he finished as runner-up to countryman Evgeni Malkin for the Art Ross.

Ovechkin and the Capitals repeated as division champions en route to meeting the New York Rangers in the opening round. After advancing to the second round in seven games, Ovechkin notched his first NHL playoff hat trick on 4 May, in game 2 against the Pittsburgh Penguins to help Washington to a 4–3 win. The Capitals were eventually defeated by Pittsburgh, the eventual Stanley Cup champions, in seven games. Ovechkin finished the 2009 playoffs with a postseason career-high 21 points in 14 games. He went on to win the Hart and Pearson trophies for the second consecutive year, becoming the seventeenth player to win the Hart multiple times.

Just over a month into the 2009–10 season, Ovechkin suffered an upper-body injury during a game against the Columbus Blue Jackets on 1 November 2009, after a collision with opposing forward Raffi Torres. After returning, Ovechkin was suspended by the NHL on 1 December for two games (one for the action, and one for a second game misconduct penalty during the season) for a knee-on-knee hit to Carolina Hurricanes defenseman Tim Gleason during a game the previous day. Both Gleason and Ovechkin had to be helped off the ice, although Gleason later returned during the game, while Ovechkin did not. Ovechkin was assessed a five-minute major penalty and a game misconduct at the time. Capitals Coach Bruce Boudreau commented that Ovechkin's style of play was at times "reckless." The suspension was Ovechkin's first of his career, causing him to forfeit $98,844.16 in salary.

On 5 January 2010, Ovechkin was named captain of the Washington Capitals after previous captain Chris Clark was traded to the Columbus Blue Jackets. He became the first European, second-youngest and 14th overall captain in team history. On 5 February, at a game against the New York Rangers, Ovechkin, with his second goal and third point of the game, reached the 500-point milestone of his NHL career. He is the fifth player to achieve the milestone in only five seasons, reaching it in 373 career games. On 14 March, at a game against the Chicago Blackhawks at the United Center, Ovechkin sent 'Hawks defenseman Brian Campbell into the boards after Campbell had dumped the puck to the blue line. Ovechkin was called for boarding, receiving a five-minute major and a game misconduct, and was suspended for two games (for a third game misconduct of the season, a two-game suspension is automatic). Campbell suffered a fractured clavicle and fractured rib, and was expected to be out seven-to-eight weeks.

Ovechkin won the 2009–10 Ted Lindsay Award, becoming only the second player in NHL history to win the award in three consecutive years. He also led the NHL in goals per game and points per game for three straight seasons, from 2008 to 2010. Ovechkin is the Capitals' all-time leader in goals.

In 2009–10 Ovechkin surpassed the mark of Hall of Fame goaltender Bill Durnan (first four seasons from 1943–44 through 1946–47) and became the first player in NHL history voted a First Team All-Star in each of his first five seasons.

In 2011, Ovechkin and the Capitals took part in the New Year's Day NHL Winter Classic, facing the Pittsburgh Penguins. Ovechkin did not score any points, but the Capitals won 3–1. On 8 March 2011, in a 5–0 victory over the Edmonton Oilers, Ovechkin recorded his 600th career point. On 5 April, Ovechkin scored his 300th career goal, becoming the sixth-youngest and seventh-fastest player to do so.

On 23 January 2012, Ovechkin received a three-game suspension for a hit on Zbyněk Michálek of the Pittsburgh Penguins. The following day, Ovechkin announced he would not attend the 2012 NHL All-Star Game due to the suspension.

2012–2017
During the NHL lockout in the first half of the shortened 2012–13 season, Ovechkin went to play in the KHL and re-joined Dynamo Moscow with his teammate Nicklas Bäckström. In 31 games for the team, Ovechkin scored 19 goals and 40 points. At the end of the season, the Dynamo would go on to win the Gagarin Cup, albeit after the NHL lockout concluded and Ovechkin and Backstrom returned to North America. However, Ovechkin still received a championship ring from the team.

In the remainder lockout-shortened 2012–13 NHL season, Ovechkin led the NHL in goal-scoring with 32, earning him his third Rocket Richard Trophy. He combined his 32 goals with 24 assists, giving him 56 points, good for third-most points in the NHL. He was also awarded the Hart Memorial Trophy for the third time in his career. Ovechkin only scored two points in a first-round exit of the 2013 Stanley Cup playoffs against the New York Rangers, during which he played with a hairline fracture in his foot. After the 2013 season, Ovechkin made history by being named to both the First and Second NHL All-Star teams. He had switched to playing right wing that entire season so was voted to the first All-Star team's right wing, but because some voters were not aware of the change, voted for him at his traditional left wing position, therefore also landing him left wing on the second All-Star team.

On 20 December 2013, in a game against the Carolina Hurricanes, Ovechkin scored his 400th career goal. He became the sixth-fastest player to ever reach that mark, getting it in 634 games, one less than Pavel Bure.

At the conclusion of the 2013–14 season, Ovechkin had the strange distinction of winning the Rocket Richard Trophy, scoring 51 goals, while going −35, one of the NHL's worst, in the plus-minus statistic. However, the Capitals missed the playoffs for the first time since 2006–07.

On 4 November 2014, in a game against the Calgary Flames, Ovechkin recorded his 826th point, a franchise record, surpassing Peter Bondra, who previously held the record with 825 points. However, the Flames won the game 4–3 in overtime. On 31 March 2015, in a game against the Carolina Hurricanes, Ovechkin scored his 50th goal of the year and became the sixth player in NHL history to have six 50-goal seasons, joining Guy Lafleur, Mike Bossy, Wayne Gretzky, Marcel Dionne and Mario Lemieux. On 2 April, Ovechkin scored his 51st and 52nd goals of the season in a 5–4 shootout win against the Montreal Canadiens, surpassing Bondra as the franchise leader in goals scored. It was also his 15th multi-goal game of the season, none of which were hat-tricks.

During the 2015–16 season, in the second period of a game against the Toronto Maple Leafs, Ovechkin scored his eighth goal of the season to tie Sergei Fedorov's tally for the most goals among Russian born players, with 483. On 19 November 2015, Ovechkin scored his ninth goal of the season in a 3–2 loss to the Dallas Stars; that goal broke Fedorov's record. On 10 January 2016, Ovechkin scored his 500th and 501st goals in a 7–1 victory over the Ottawa Senators, becoming the 43rd player to reach the 500-goal plateau, and the fifth-fastest player to do so, as well as the first Russian. On 9 April, Ovechkin scored his 50th goal of the season and became the third player in NHL history to have seven or more 50-goal seasons.

During the 2015–16 season, Ovechkin, for the first time in his career, did not lead the Washington Capitals in points, although he still led the team in goals with 50, and finished second on the team in points with 71, behind fellow countryman Evgeny Kuznetsov, who finished with 77. In the second round of the 2016 Stanley Cup playoffs, the Washington Capitals lost the series to the Pittsburgh Penguins in game 6 after a 4–3 overtime defeat.

On 11 January 2017, Ovechkin scored his 1,000th career point, becoming the 37th player in NHL history to reach 1,000 points with only one team.

2017–present
As the "face of the Capitals" for over a decade, Ovechkin had taken "the lion's share of the blame" for the team's failing record postseason, which had included three straight exits during the second round, two of them dealt by the Pittsburgh Penguins. The loss to the Penguins in the 2017 playoffs was particularly devastating to the Capitals. And while Crosby had won three Stanley Cups with the Penguins, Ovechkin was being considered the greatest hockey player never to have won one, with his main nemesis being largely to blame. Advancing age, consideration of his legacy, and the desire to beat Crosby's Penguins in the postseason combined to change Ovechkin's approach to hockey in the 2017–18 season and beyond. After engaging in a more intense pre-season fitness training than usual, focusing more on speed work and condition, Ovechkin returned to training camp in Washington two weeks early and predicted: "We're not gonna be fucking suck this year ." He then scored seven times in the team's first two games, performing a hat trick in both games.

Ovechkin broke many NHL and Capitals' records during the 2017–18 season. On 7 October 2017, he became the first player in 100 years with back-to-back hat-tricks to start the season. As well, on 25 November, Ovechkin passed Bondra as the team's all-time leader in hat-tricks with his 20th of his career. On 21 October, in a game against the Detroit Red Wings, Ovechkin surpassed Jaromír Jágr for most regular season overtime goals with the 20th of his career.

On 12 March 2018, Ovechkin scored his 600th career goal, making him the 20th player to do so, and the fourth to do so in less than 1,000 games. On 1 April 2018 Ovechkin would play against the Pittsburgh Penguins in his 1,000th regular season NHL game, becoming the first Capitals player to play 1,000 games and the 54th NHL player to do so with the same franchise. At the conclusion of the regular season, Ovechkin was awarded the Rocket Richard trophy for the seventh time in his career. He became the second player, tied with Bobby Hull, to win the NHL's goal scoring title seven times.

During the 2018 playoffs, Ovechkin scored 15 goals and 27 points in 24 games and averaging 20:44 of ice time per game. That year the Capitals would once again meet their longtime rivals, the Pittsburgh Penguins, in the Eastern Conference semifinals; headed by Sidney Crosby, Ovechkin's main rival for greatest player of his generation, the Penguins had been victorious in nine of their previous 10 encounters with the Capitals. The Capitals broke the trend, however, with Ovechkin assisting Evgeny Kuznetsov's game six overtime goal to clinch his first Eastern Conference finals appearance in 13 seasons with the Capitals.

The Capitals reached the Stanley Cup Finals, the second time they had done so (they previously did in 1998), and defeated the Vegas Golden Knights in five games to win the Stanley Cup. Ovechkin won the Conn Smythe trophy, awarded to the most valuable player for his team in the playoffs.

On 6 December 2018, Ovechkin became the fastest player in NHL history and ninth overall to take 5,000 shots on goal, reaching that mark in 1,031 career games. Marcel Dionne, the previous holder of the record, required 184 more games. He scored the 21st hat-trick of his NHL career in a 6–2 win over Detroit Red Wings on 11 December, passing Pavel Bure for most by a Russian-born player in league history. Ovechkin had a career-best 14 game point streak during the season, which included back-to-back hat tricks. Ovechkin was named a captain for the 2019 National Hockey League All-Star Game, but announced that he was choosing to skip the game to rest, forcing him to serve an automatic one game suspension as a result. Ovechkin would be named captain again the next year, and again chose to skip the game to rest, and would serve another one game suspension. On 22 February 2020, Ovechkin scored his 700th career goal in the third period of a 3–2 loss against the New Jersey Devils, making him the eighth player in NHL history to accomplish the feat. The season ended early due to the COVID-19 pandemic, so Ovechkin and Bruins' forward David Pastrňák were named co-winners of the Rocket Richard Trophy, with each having 48 goals at the time.

Ovechkin signed a five-year, $47.5 million contract extension with the Capitals on 27 July 2021. He scored his 28th career hat trick, tying Marcel Dionne and Bobby Hull for sixth most in NHL history, on 26 November 2021. On 31 December, Ovechkin scored his 275th power play goal, breaking Dave Andreychuk's all-time record. On 16 March 2022, Ovechkin scored his 767th career NHL goal, moving him into third place for goals scored all-time in the NHL, passing Jaromír Jágr; he achieved the feat in 477 fewer games than Jagr, yet had also taken 400 more shots on goal. On 20 April, he scored his 50th goal of the season for the ninth time in his career, tying Mike Bossy and Wayne Gretzky for having the most 50-goal seasons in NHL history. At 36 years and 215 days of age, he is the oldest player to score 50 goals in a season; the previous oldest was Johnny Bucyk, doing so at the age of 35 years and 308 days.

On 5 November 2022, Ovechkin scored his 787th goal with the Washington Capitals, setting a new NHL record for most goals with one team, a record previously held by Gordie Howe. He set another NHL best on 29 November, surpassing Gretzky for most road goals with 403, after scoring two goals against the Canucks. Ovechkin became the third player in NHL history to score 800 regular season goals, behind Howe and Gretzky, by scoring a hat trick against the Chicago Blackhawks on 13 December. It was his 29th hat trick in the NHL, giving him the sixth most hat tricks by any player in the league's history. On 23 December, Ovechkin scored his 801st and 802nd career goals in a 4–1 win against the Winnipeg Jets, passing Gordie Howe for the second most goals in NHL history, behind only Wayne Gretzky.

Ovechkin tied Mike Gartner for having the most 30-goal seasons upon recording a 30-goal season for the 17th time on 14 January 2023, in a 3–1 loss to the Philadelphia Flyers.

Player profile

Ovechkin is widely considered one of the greatest goal scorers in NHL history, with what some consider a real chance at overtaking Wayne Gretzky in total career goals (894). He is famous for his deadly one-timer, which he typically fires from the left faceoff circle, an area known as his "office." Former teammate Brooks Orpik said of his one-timer, "You know it's going there, and you still can't stop him." Ovechkin proves "the exception rather than the rule when it comes to success" on one-timers, which "can be very difficult to pull off," involving as they do "taking a hard pass and timing a shot perfectly, when the puck may be rolling or on end, while also aiming at a small net, particularly from far distances."

Ovechkin has been awarded the Hart Memorial Trophy honoring the most valuable player in the league three times (2008, 2009, 2013). Ovechkin's most enduring nickname is "The Great 8."

Ovechkin's ability to shoot heavily as a power forward has been well documented. After clinching the hardest shot title at the 2018 NHL All-Star game skills competition with a 98.8 mph first attempt, he became the only player in the 2018 All Star game to break the century mark, surpassing 100 mph on his second shot, stepping "up to plate and delivered a blistering 101.3 MPH blast."

 
In an October 2018 game against the Canucks, after Vancouver had pulled their goalie, Ovechkin passed the puck to teammate T. J. Oshie rather than score the easy hat trick for himself. "[Oshie asked] 'Why you pass me the puck?'" Ovechkin said. "But he was so wide open and I try to give him pass. Save mine for next time."

The Capitals' morning skate ritually begins with captain Ovechkin "sprinting around the rink, a solo lap to the sound of sticks tapping from his teammates." Once he's made it all the way around, the rest of the team jumps onto the ice to join him. Ovechkin is known as a durable player, losing little time to injuries. After being struck on the foot by a teammate's wrist shot during a 2006 game in Vancouver, he "crumpled to the ice and had to be helped to the locker room." Exhibiting no ill effects in practice the next day, Ovechkin famously told reporters, "I'm okay; Russian machine never breaks."

Late in the 2008–09 season, Ovechkin garnered some criticism over his exuberant after-goal celebrations. On 28 February 2009, during a segment of Hockey Night in Canada'''s Coach's Corner, Canadian hockey analyst Don Cherry likened Ovechkin's celebrations of jumping into the boards and his teammates to that of soccer players, concluding that this was not the Canadian way and advising Canadian kids to ignore Ovechkin's example. Capitals coach Bruce Boudreau came to Ovechkin's defense, stating Cherry "doesn't know Alex like we know Alex", and Ovechkin himself stated that he "doesn't care" about Cherry. The next notable incident happened on 19 March 2009, in a game against the Tampa Bay Lightning. After scoring his 50th goal of the season, Ovechkin put his stick on the ice, pretending to warm his hands over it because it was "hot." The incident sparked an immediate response from Tampa Bay coach Rick Tocchet, who said that "[Ovechkin] went down a notch in my books." Boudreau had also stated that he would discuss the incident with Ovechkin, and teammate Mike Green, despite being the first to celebrate with Ovechkin afterwards, commented that he did not wish to join in the pre-meditated celebration. Ovechkin himself was unapologetic, and said about Don Cherry in particular, "He's going to be pissed off for sure...I love it!".

After using and endorsing CCM equipment for most of his career, Ovechkin made the move to Bauer Hockey in August 2011 following a decline in his point production in the 2010–11 season. He continued to use Bauer equipment until the 2017 season, when he switched back to CCM. Ovechkin currently uses the Ribcor Trigger stick and Super Tacks AS1 skates.

International play

At the age of 16, Ovechkin played at the 2002 World U-17 Hockey Challenge, where he scored two hat tricks, one against Switzerland and one against the United States, and an assist.

At the age of 17, when he was selected by Russian coach Viktor Tikhonov to play in the Česká Pojišťovna Cup EuroTour tournament, Ovechkin became the youngest skater ever to play for the Russian national team. In that tournament, he also became the youngest player ever to score for the national team. He also was selected to play at the 2002 IIHF World U18 Championships, in which he amassed 14 goals and four assists in eight games, leading Russia to a silver medal. Ovechkin now shares the single tournament goals record with Cole Caufield, who scored as many in seven games at the 2019 IIHF World U18 Championships.

At the age of 18, Ovechkin was named captain of the junior Russian national team. Russia finished fifth in the tournament. In 2003, the team would go on to win a gold medal in the World Junior Championships.

At the age of 19, Ovechkin was named to the Russian national team for the 2004 World Cup of Hockey, making him the youngest player to play in the tournament.

Also at 19, Ovechkin was named captain of the junior team in the 2005 World Junior Ice Hockey Championships. The tournament, lasting from 25 December 2004 to 4 January 2005, was Ovechkin's third and last. At the conclusion of the tournament, he had collected seven goals, tied for the tournament lead. His team received the silver medal after losing the gold medal game to Canada on 4 January, and Ovechkin was named the Best Forward of the tournament as well as selected to the tournament All-Star team. In 2005, Ovechkin played in his first IIHF men's World Championships. He scored five goals and three assists, landing eighth in the top scorers list and sharing third place in goal scoring.

In 2006, Ovechkin played in his first Winter Olympic Games. Although Russia came away from the games without a medal, Ovechkin scored five goals in the tournament, including the game-winner against Canada's Martin Brodeur, eliminating Canada from the tournament. Ovechkin was the only player not on the Swedish (gold medal winners) or Finnish (silver medal winners) teams to be named to the all-tournament team.

At the 2006 IIHF World Championships, Ovechkin scored six goals and three assists (nine points) in seven games before Russia lost 4–3 to the Czech Republic in the quarter-finals. For his efforts, Ovechkin was one of six players selected to the Media All-Star team.

At the 2008 IIHF World Championships, Ovechkin helped lead Russia to the gold medal by finishing with 12 points (six goals, six assists) in nine games. He was selected to the Media All-Star team for the second time in five tournament appearances.

In the 2010 Winter Olympics, Ovechkin and Team Russia were one of the favorites to win the Gold Medal. Despite high expectations, Russia lost to Canada 7–3 in the quarterfinals. Ovechkin finished with two goals and two assists in Russia's four games.

After being eliminated in the first round of the NHL playoffs, Ovechkin joined Russia for the 2010 IIHF World Championships along with many other Russian stars, such as Evgeni Malkin, Pavel Datsyuk and Ilya Kovalchuk. Despite being heavily favored to win the tournament, Russia lost to the Czech Republic in the finals.

Ovechkin also joined the Russian team for the 2011 IIHF World Championships after the Capitals were eliminated from the NHL playoffs. He played in five games for the Russian team, but did not manage to score any points, the first time he failed to score any points in a World Championship tournament.

Ovechkin played in Russia's last three games of the 2012 IIHF World Championships. He recorded two goals and two assists as Russia won the tournament.

Ovechkin also represented Russia in 2013 IIHF World Championships. He joined the national team after the Capitals were eliminated from the Stanley Cup playoffs in 2013. Russia had already advanced to the first playoff round where they faced the U.S. The Americans defeated Russia 8–3, eliminating them from the tournament.

In the 2014 Winter Olympics, Ovechkin represented Russia under enormous pressure as the tournament was hosted on home ice in Sochi. Russia lost to arch-rivals Finland 3–1 in the quarter-final round.

Ovechkin participated in the 2014 IIHF World Championships where Russia won gold. After the tournament, he asked Vladimir Putin to reward the Russian hockey team on an equal basis with the 2014 Olympic champions. That was criticized as the World Championship was considered insignificant compared to Olympic gold, which Russia had failed to win earlier that year in Sochi. He also joined the Russian team late in the 2015 IIHF World Championships, where Russia won the silver medal.

Off the ice
Ovechkin was the cover athlete of 2K Sports hockey simulation video game NHL 2K10, as well as the cover athlete of EA Sports' NHL 07 and NHL 21. On 11 June 2008, Ovechkin launched his own line of designer streetwear with CCM. On 6 July 2009, Ovechkin was named an ambassador for the 2014 Winter Olympics in Sochi, Russia. In late 2009, he was named GQ's 48th most powerful person in Washington, D.C.

During the 2010–11 season, Ovechkin was featured in one of ESPN's This is SportsCenter commercials, in which he laughed off a question by ESPN personality Steve Levy accusing him of being a Russian spy before being pulled upward by a line through an open ceiling tile by countryman and then-Capitals teammate Semyon Varlamov.

Ovechkin is a dedicated car enthusiast, owning many fine automobiles, such as a Mercedes-Benz SL65 AMG Black Series and a custom Mercedes S63 AMG. At the 2015 NHL All-Star Game, Ovechkin lobbied Honda for a new car, and brought an element of fun silliness to the "draft" where he was chosen third to last; the last two players selected, Ryan Nugent-Hopkins and Filip Forsberg, each received a new car, but Ovechkin would not give up. When Honda representatives asked his agent why he wanted a car so badly, they were told that he planned to donate it to the American Special Hockey Association, and at the end of the event, he was handed the keys to a new Honda Accord. That Accord was auctioned off, and the proceeds used to benefit the charity Ovechkin highlighted and brought attention to with his antics.

Following the Capitals' 2018 Stanley Cup victory, Ovechkin participated in a number of memorable celebrations, including an incident where he and teammates T. J. Oshie, Braden Holtby, Lars Eller and Tom Wilson swam in the fountains at the Georgetown waterfront with the Cup. The summer after the championship was dubbed by the Washington media as "The Summer of Ovi."

Ovechkin has appeared in three films: Zaytsev, zhgi! Istoriya shoumena (2010) as an actor, and NHL: Just Like Me (2008) and Boys to the Bigs (2008) as himself.

Ovechkin is a keen football fan and an avid supporter of Liverpool F.C. He is also an investor in the Washington Spirit, a professional team in the National Women's Soccer League. In 2022, he signed a one-game contract with FC Dynamo Moscow, the club his father played for, in a friendly against FC Amkal Moscow. He wore the number 3 jersey in honor of his father, who wore the number when he played football for the club. Ovechkin scored a goal in the match.

Russian politics
In 2017, Ovechkin said: "I have a good relationship with Russians and with Americans. So, I'm neutral." In November 2017, Ovechkin started a movement called PutinTeam in support of Russian President Vladimir Putin during the 2018 Russian presidential election. Asked whether it was political, Ovechkin described his actions as a show of support for Russia, "I just support my country, you know? That's where I'm from, my parents live there, all my friends. Like every human from different countries, they support their president. It's not about political stuff." Of his participation in PutinTeam, Ovechkin also said:

PutinTeam was first announced in a 2 November 2017 post on Ovechkin’s Instagram account, which has over one million followers. On 23 November, Ovechkin announced on his Instagram that the group's official website had been launched. On the soft launch of the site, visitors were encouraged to sign up for the team, track related news, participate in contests and attend and organize events. Ovechkin has claimed that the idea for PutinTeam was all his and that the group is non-political in its nature. Vedomosti, a Russian financial newspaper, reported that Kremlin sources have said that IMA-Consulting were behind the creation of the organization. A Kremlin-supported public-relations firm, IMA-Consulting reportedly holds a $600,000 contract to promote the 2018 Russian presidential elections. The Kremlin spoke in support of the movement after its announcement. According to The Washington Post, Ovechkin has a personal relationship with Putin. Ovechkin has a personal phone number for Putin, who is a big hockey fan, and received a gift from Putin at his 2016 wedding. Ovechkin said that he and Putin don't have much in common: "We talk about hockey and all that stuff. That's it."

On 25 February 2022, following the Russian invasion of Ukraine, Ovechkin called for peace without mentioning Russia or Ukraine directly. In May 2022, he reiterated his support for Putin, as well as retaining the Russian president on his Instagram profile photo.

Feud with Evgeni Malkin

Ovechkin was reportedly involved in a feud with Pittsburgh Penguins forward Evgeni Malkin, who was drafted second behind Ovechkin in the 2004 NHL Entry Draft. Though the two were reported to be good friends when they roomed together during the 2006 Winter Olympics in Turin, Italy, this friendship quickly soured. The feud may have started in August 2007 when Ovechkin supposedly punched Malkin's Russian agent, Gennady Ushakov, at a Moscow nightclub. Ovechkin has denied that version of events, while Malkin confirmed it. On 21 January 2008, in Pittsburgh, Ovechkin took a run at Malkin, which would have seemingly resulted in a devastating hit had Malkin not ducked out of the way just in time. The two would also not make eye contact at the 2008 NHL Awards Ceremony. Ovechkin has repeatedly denied "having it out" for Malkin.

The feud raised many concerns as to its effect on the league, and the Russian national team at the 2010 Winter Olympics in Vancouver. On 24 January 2009, at the SuperSkills Competition, Malkin assisted Ovechkin in his stunt during the Breakaway Challenge. Malkin handed Ovechkin his props for the stunt as well as handing him his stick and pouring some sports drink down Ovechkin's throat. It has been reported that Ilya Kovalchuk, who was then the Atlanta Thrashers' captain and a teammate of Ovechkin and Malkin on the Russian national team, brokered the peace between the two.

Malkin gave a speech at Ovechkin's 35th birthday party in September 2020. The two are reportedly very close friends, with the feud long in the past.

Personal life
Ovechkin was formerly engaged to tennis player Maria Kirilenko. On 21 July 2014, Kirilenko announced that the wedding was called off and that the two were no longer seeing each other. On 11 September 2015, Ovechkin announced his engagement to Nastya Shubskaya, the daughter of Vera Glagoleva, whom he subsequently married.

Ovechkin and his wife have two children. On 18 August 2018, the couple had a son, whom they named Sergei after Ovechkin's late brother. On 27 May 2020, the couple had another son.

, Ovechkin is currently studying for and is close to obtaining a Doctor of Sciences, the Russian equivalent of a PhD or higher doctorate. Ovechkin's field of study is Pedagogical Sciences.

Career statistics
Regular season and playoffs

Bold indicates led league

International

Honors, awards, and achievements

  Order of Honour
 Asteroid 257261 Ovechkin was named in his honor by Leonid Elenin.
 Ride of Fame honored Alex Ovechkin with a double-decker sightseeing bus in Washington, D.C.
 The day after he received his first Hart Memorial Trophy as league MVP for the 2007–08 season, he was given the key to the city by Washington Mayor Adrian M. Fenty for being the first Washington MVP winner in a major sport since Joe Theismann of the Washington Redskins in 1983.

Records
NHL records
 First player to win the Art Ross Trophy, Maurice Richard Trophy, Lester B. Pearson Award, and Hart Memorial Trophy in a single season.
 Only player to be named to the NHL first All-Star team in each of his first five seasons
 Most NHL goal scoring titles with 9
 Most goals scored by a left wing in a career – 812''
 Most goals for a single team – 812
 Most goals scored on the road in a career – 411
 Most goals scored by a left wing in a season – 65 goals (2007–08)
 Most points scored by a left wing rookie – 106 (2005–06)
 Most shots on goal by a left wing in a season – 528 (2008–09)
 Most shots on goal by a rookie in a season – 425 (2005–06)
 Most regular season points by a Russian-born NHL rookie – 106 (2005–06)
 Fastest overtime goal – 6 seconds on 15 December 2006 versus Atlanta Thrashers (tied with Mats Sundin and David Legwand)
 Only player to be named to both the NHL First and second All-Star teams in the same season (2012–13)
 Most goals by a Russian-born player – 812
 Most points by a Russian-born player – 1,464
 Most points by a left winger
 Most career shots on goal – 6,288
 Most career overtime goals – 24
 Most career power play goals – 295
 Most career game-opening goals – 136
 Most consecutive 30-goal seasons – 15 (tied with Mike Gartner and Jaromír Jágr)
 Most career 30-goal seasons – 17 (tied with Mike Gartner)
 Most career 40-goal seasons – 12 (tied with Wayne Gretzky)
 Most career 45-goal seasons – 12
 Most career 50-goal seasons – 9 (tied with Mike Bossy and Wayne Gretzky)

Washington Capitals records
 Most seasons with 50 or more goals – 9 (2005–06, 2007–08, 2008–09, 2009–10, 2013–14, 2014–15, 2015–16, 2018–19, 2021–22)
 Most shots on goal in a season – 528 (2008–09)
 Most goals in a season – 65 goals (2007–08)
 Most power play goals – 295 (16 February 2023)
 Most power play goals in a season – 25 goals (2014–15)
 Most career overtime goals – 25 goals
 Most career penalty shots attempted – 12 shots (most recent on 19 January 2016)
 Most goals in a season by a rookie – 52 goals (2005–06)
 Most points in a season by a rookie – 106 points (2005–06)
 Point streak by a rookie – 11 games (17 points; 5 goals, 12 assists; 18 March–7 April 2006)
 Point streak by a rookie to start the season – 8 games
 Goal streak by a rookie – 7 games (10 February–8 March 2006)
 Most career hat tricks – 31
 Most career goals – 812 (as of 16 February 2023)
 Most career points – 1,464 (as of 16 February 2023)
 Most goals in a single postseason – 15 (2017–18)

See also
 List of NHL players with 50-goal seasons
 List of NHL players with 500 goals
 List of NHL players with 100-point seasons
 List of NHL players with 1,000 games played
 List of NHL players with 1,000 points

Notes

References

Bibliography

External links

 
 Alex Ovechkin bio: IMDb.com
 Alex Ovechkin bio: Biography.com
 Alex Ovechkin bio: Britannica.com

1985 births
Living people
Art Ross Trophy winners
Calder Trophy winners
Conn Smythe Trophy winners
Eastern Orthodox Christians from Russia
Expatriate ice hockey players in the United States
FC Dynamo Moscow players
Hart Memorial Trophy winners
HC Dynamo Moscow players
Ice hockey people from Moscow
Ice hockey people from Washington, D.C.
Ice hockey players at the 2006 Winter Olympics
Ice hockey players at the 2010 Winter Olympics
Ice hockey players at the 2014 Winter Olympics
Lester B. Pearson Award winners
Mordvin people
National Hockey League All-Stars
National Hockey League first-overall draft picks
National Hockey League first-round draft picks
Olympic ice hockey players of Russia
Rocket Richard Trophy winners
Russian emigrants to the United States
Russian expatriate ice hockey people
Russian expatriate sportspeople in the United States
Russian footballers
Russian ice hockey left wingers
Russian Orthodox Christians from Russia
Russian philanthropists
Russian State University of Physical Education, Sport, Youth and Tourism alumni
Stanley Cup champions
Washington Capitals captains
Washington Capitals draft picks
Washington Capitals players